Gary Webster may refer to:

 Gary Webster (actor) (born 1964), English actor
 Gary Webster (engineer), manager of the Toronto Transit Commission in Toronto, Ontario, Canada
 Gary Webster (rugby league) (born 1957), Australian rugby league player